EC Music is the record label of IEC Record, subsidiary of IEC and fellow subsidiary of Media 8 Entertainment.  The first artist signed by EC Music is Sam Hui. In October 2007, EC Music has released an album consisting of 10 new songs of Sam Hui after his last new album 17 years ago.  In February 2008, EC Music released a classical-pop album for VEGA.

Artists
The artists currently under the record label are:

Sam Hui
Daniel Chan
Vega
Rannes Man

External links
 EC Music

Hong Kong record labels